Streptomyces pathocidini is a bacterium species from the genus of Streptomyces. Streptomyces pathocidini produces blasticidin S and pathocidin-(8-azaguanine).

See also 
 List of Streptomyces species

References

Further reading

External links
Type strain of Streptomyces pathocidini at BacDive -  the Bacterial Diversity Metadatabase	

pathocidini
Bacteria described in 2014